Édouard André may refer to:

Édouard André (1840–1911), French horticulturalist
Édouard André (consul), (fl. 1898) Belgian consul during the Battle of Manila
Édouard André (art collector) (1833–1894), husband of Nélie Jacquemart-André